Clarence D. “Lucky” Lester (February 23, 1923 – March 17, 1986) was an American fighter pilot who served in the 332nd Fighter Group, commonly known as the Tuskegee Airmen, during World War II. He was one of the first African-American military aviators in the United States Army Air Corps, the United States Army Air Forces and later the United States Air Force. 

Lester best known as one of two Tuskegee pilots who shot down three Focke-Wulf Fw 190 or Messerschmitt Bf 109 on a single mission; the other pilot was Captain Joseph Elsberry. Lester flew a P-51 Mustang nicknamed "Miss Pelt." He and Elsberry are two of only four Tuskegee Airmen to have earned three aerial victories in a single day of combat.

Early life, family, education
Lester was born on February 23, 1923, in Richmond, Virginia. Raised in Chicago, Illinois, Lester attended West Virginia State College where he was a star football player. On May 17, 1946, Lester was initiated as a fraternity brother of Kappa Alpha Psi, Iota chapter at the University of Chicago.

World War II

The Tuskegee Airmen is the popular name of a group of African-American military pilots (fighter and bomber) who fought in World War II. They formed the 332nd Fighter Group and the 477th Bombardment Group of the United States Army Air Forces. Lester recalled that "Being a black pilot in the 1940s was like being a pro athlete today ... We knew we were special, that we would have to prove something. This was the first chance blacks had had outside of working in the kitchen or the possibility [sic] of being a truck driver." White pilots would fly around 50 combat missions but because there were no replacements, black pilots of the Tuskegee Airmen flew around 70 missions. During the war he flew over 90 combat missions.

Overall, Lester was one of only nine Tuskegee Airmen pilots with at least three confirmed kills during World War II.

Awards
Congressional Gold Medal awarded to the Tuskegee Airmen in 2006

After WWII
While flying an F-84E Thunderjet it experienced mechanical failure and exploded into flames forcing Lester to yank his ejection seat and parachute from the inflamed jet, which made him "only the sixth pilot ever to use the ejection method." Later in his career he also worked with the infamous "Whiz kids" that Robert McNamara assembled at the Office of the Secretary of Defense. In 1969 Lester retired as a full colonel and was then appointed as associate director of social services in Rockville, Maryland.

In 1969, Lester, along with three Department of Defense analysts, also founded the company which would later become ICF International following his military service. The original Inner City Fund was a venture capital firm aimed at supporting minority-owned businesses to achieve government contracts. In the early 1970s the company transitioned toward a consulting model and has now achieved over $1.5B in annual revenue.

Personal life 
Lester was Catholic.

Bibliography 
Notes

References 

 - Total pages: 319 
 - Total pages: 180
 - Total pages: 336
 - Total pages: 424
  

1923 births
1986 deaths
United States Army Air Forces personnel of World War II
Aviators from Virginia
People from Richmond, Virginia
Recipients of the Distinguished Flying Cross (United States)
Recipients of the Air Medal
Tuskegee Airmen
United States Air Force officers
United States Army Air Forces officers
African-American aviators
African-American Catholics